Mourad Sahraoui (born January 12, 1983) is an amateur boxer from Tunisia best known to win Gold in the heavyweight division at the 2007 All-African Games.

Career
Sahraoui failed to qualify for the 2004 Athens Games by ending up in third place at the 2nd AIBA African 2004 Olympic Qualifying Tournament in Gaborone, Botswana. He won the 2005 Africa Championships. At the World Championships in 2005 he competed at light heavyweight and defeated Yusiel Napoles and two other opponents, but lost in the quarterfinal to eventual winner Yerdos Dzhanabergenov.

At the Arab Championships 2007 he defeated Abdelhafid Benchebla, but lost the final to Egyptian Ramadan Yasser 13:14. At the 2007 All-Africa Games he fought at heavyweight and defeated David Assiene of Cameroon and Abdelaziz Toulbini of Algeria in the first rounds and then Lateef Kayode of Nigeria in the final.

At the PanArab Games he once again fought at light heavy and again was edged out by Yasser in the final 6:7. He qualified for the Olympics 2008 but lost to Zhang Xiaoping 1:3.

External links
Africa 2005
World Champs 2005
Arabchamps 2007
Results Africa 2007
PanArab games
Qualifier
Mourad Sahraoui's profile at ESPN Sports

1983 births
Living people
Boxers at the 2008 Summer Olympics
Olympic boxers of Tunisia
Tunisian male boxers
Mediterranean Games gold medalists for Tunisia
Competitors at the 2001 Mediterranean Games
Competitors at the 2005 Mediterranean Games
African Games gold medalists for Tunisia
African Games medalists in boxing
Mediterranean Games medalists in boxing
Competitors at the 2007 All-Africa Games
Heavyweight boxers
21st-century Tunisian people